Bischheim is a municipality in the Donnersbergkreis district, in Rhineland-Palatinate, Germany. Bischheim has an area of 6.57 km² and a population of 799 (as of December 31, 2020).

References

Municipalities in Rhineland-Palatinate
Donnersbergkreis